Ramiro Adame López (born in the 1970s), also known as The Rio Bravo Assassin among many other aliases, is a Mexican serial killer who was convicted of killing three women in Ciudad Juárez but is suspected of up to 27 more, some of those underage. He was captured and sentenced to prison time for three murders in 1986, but he escaped in 1990 and after remaining a fugitive from justice, he was recaptured in New Mexico and deported from the US back to Ciudad Juárez. On January 24, 2014 he was delivered halfway through the Reforma International Bridge, from Lerdo Avenue by ICE agents to agents from the Mexican Ministerial Police. Currently, he is one of the main suspects in the unsolved femincides in Ciudad Juárez. He was a disorganized, sedentary, hedonistic murderer motivated by sexual compulsion and predatory behaviour.

Background 
Padilla lived in the Mariscal district of downtown Juárez as a regular drug addict.

Crimes 
In 1986, the bodies of young women began to appear on the banks of the Rio Grande, representing one of the first feminicides reported in Ciudad Juárez. The women, some of them underage, showed signs of sexual abuse and were killed by strangulation.

Pedro Padilla used to follow his victims to deserted places where he subdued and raped them, choking them with his bare hands, supposedly this was done to make the vagina contract during the violation.

Quite possibly, Flores committed the crimes under the influence of drugs. According to Joel Norris, drug use is frequent during the first behavioural phase of a serial killer, in which they distance themselves from reality.

Apprehension, condemnation and escape 
Padilla was captured in 1986, by the Second Commander of the Judicial Police of the state of Chihuahua, Felipe Pando. Pedro Padilla Flores confessed to 30 murders but only 3 could be proven: two of women and one of a 13-year-old girl.

He was sentenced to life imprisonment, but was held for only 4 years in the Social Rehabilitation Center of Ciudad Juárez, and since his escape from prison in 1990 in what represents one of largest cases of police negligence and incompetence in Mexico, but was arrested in the US by ICE agents and handed over to the Mexican authorities on January 24, 2014 to be tried for the pending crimes.

New crimes 
In 1992, the murders of women in Juárez began again. For Felipe Pando, Flores remains the main suspect:

Although Pando has one of the worst reputations within the border police, with several complaints of torture and forced confessions, it is undeniable that many of the recent crimes against women in Juárez correspond to the pattern and modus operandi of Padilla Flores.

The murder of Hester S. van Nierop 
On September 20, 1998, the body of Dutch citizen Hester Suzanne van Nierop was found under the bed of a hotel room in the red zone of Ciudad Juárez; she had been raped and strangled, had multiple mutilations that correspond to defeminization pattern and also had incisions on her neck.

Hester had arrived at the hotel on September 19, 1998 in the company of a man. The person who had rented the room had signed in as "Roberto Flores".

Portrayal 
Van Nierop's partner was described to the police as:

The description matched to that of Pedro Padilla Flores' and the murderer had signed in with his second name, but the modus operandi did not match, as this time it was an organized killer, apparently evolving. Hester was not the first and not last to die this way, and Flores became the main suspect in her death and the deaths of others.

Investigation and detention 
The Attorney General of the State of Chihuahua implemented a series of intelligence and covert operations, after resuming the matter, since 2004 an arrest was issued.

The probable culprit was a moderately-known person in central Juárez, a subject that attracted attention with his special characteristics: deformed handset, athletic build and striking tattoos that showed a naked woman.

Ramiro Adame López/Roberto Flores was placed in a USA jail; however, an extensive search was made, as he used up to seven different aliases.

Agents of the Cyber Police and the Intelligence Agency made contact with the murderer on Facebook, where an agent passed himself off as a woman, kept constant communication and in a span of seven months managed to gain his trust, which was reflected when he confessed to the committing the murder of the Dutch citizen.

In December 2013, investigating agents of the Intelligence Agency and the Office of the Attorney General of Chihuahua obtained specific data on Ramiro Adame López's location - he was in Adams County, Mississippi in a Federal Bureau of Prisoners, where he was detained for drug trafficking.

In cooperation with the FBI and ICE, the detention of López in one of the latter's prisons was confirmed, for which international legal assistance began to move him back to Ciudad Juárez and judge him for the crime.

On January 15, 2014, López was deported to Juárez, where he was served with the arrest warrant for the murder of van Nierop, and placed at the disposal of the judge who required it.

Sentence 
Once in national territory, the judge who displaced the arrest warrant claimed it and a process against López was initiated, which ended on December 1, 2015, when the General Prosecutor presented a solid and reliable investigation, integrated by technical tests, scientific studies, analysis, documentaries, expert opinions that ultimately convicted Ramiro Adame López for the homicide of Hester van Nierop.

The Public Ministry had a total of seven testimonies who saw him together at the crime scene with the victim. A receptionist who was present said: "I wrote down his name with my own hand and have the record book from the time", but in addition expert tests which included footprints were presented.

Finally, after a 17-year struggle, justice was done to the victim's family, which is recounted by Mrs. Arséne van Nierop's book "A cry for help from Juárez", which also details the creation of the Hester Foundation in 2005, in which the work of the Casa Amiga crisis center is supported by offering psychic, legal, educational and social help to Mexican women and informing about the prevention of violence.

A matter of international relevance 
The issue generated a strong reaction from the Dutch government that made an international diplomatic claim. The matter was practically without movement, the alleged perpetrator was not captured and during all that time there was strong pressure due to the intervention of the United States Organization and the Inter-American Commission of Human Rights.

On the day of the sentencing, Attorney General of Chihuahua, Jorge Enrique González Nicolás, contacted the Dutch ambassador in Mexico, who, during the entire process, was on the watch and in touch with the agency. He also linked with the victim's mother and the federal authorities to inform them of the conclusion of the criminal process.

Once the murderer was arrested, diplomatic authorities from the Netherlands made a comment of gratitude to the Mexican State, as this was a matter of international importance and interest. With the condemnatory sentence of 35 years in prison and reparation of damage, it is fully complied with the petition before the Inter-American Commission of Human Rights to do justice for van Nierop.

See also 
 Abdel Latif Sharif
 Alejandro Máynez
 Ángel Maturino Reséndiz
 Daniel Audiel López Martínez
 List of serial killers by country
 List of serial killers by number of victims

References

External links 
1. The Herald of Chihuahua (December 3, 2015), Reportaje especial de El Heraldo de Chihuahua sobre caso resuelto de la joven Holandesa Hester Van Nierop, Web of the Attorney General of Chihuahua2. The Chihuahua Diary (December 1, 2015), Luego de 17 años, lo sentencian a 35 por homicidio de holandesa.3. El Paso Times (December 2, 2015), Suspect in Dutch woman's 1998 murder sentenced.

Fugitives wanted by Mexico
Living people
Male serial killers
Mexican murderers of children
Mexican rapists
Mexican serial killers
Year of birth missing (living people)